Meropidia rufa is a species of hoverfly in the family Syrphidae.

Distribution
Ecuador.

References

Eristalinae
Insects described in 1983
Diptera of South America
Taxa named by F. Christian Thompson